Colas Breugnon (Kola Bryun'on) is a Russian-language opera in three acts by Dmitry Kabalevsky, also known as The Master-Craftsman of Clamecy (Мастера из Кламси ; Mastera iz Clamsy) op. 24 in Russia. The libretto by V. Bragin is based on Romain Rolland's novel about a fictional Burgundian optimist named Colas Breugnon set in 16th-century Clamecy, Nièvre. The opera premiered under the direction of Samosud in Leningrad in 1938. The opera is best known for its "rollicking" overture.

References

1938 operas
Operas by Dmitry Kabalevsky
Russian-language operas
Operas
Operas set in France
Operas set in the 16th century
Operas based on novels